Tullia Running Her Chariot over the Body of Her Father is a 1735 painting by Michel-François Dandré-Bardon which depicts Roman princess Tullia (later Rome's last queen) running over her father King Servius Tullius's dead body with her chariot. Upon the submission of this work Bardon was accepted into the Académie royale de peinture et de sculpture.

See also
 Tullia Drives over the Corpse of her Father, by Jean Bardin
 Tullia driving her Chariot over her Father, by Giuseppe Bartolomeo Chiari
 Tullia Driving her Chariot over the Body of her Father by François-Guillaume Ménageot

References

Further reading
 Women in Livy: Tullia Minor
 

1735 paintings
Cultural depictions of Tullia Minor
Cultural depictions of Servius Tullius